Juan de Sancto Mathía Sáenz de Mañozca y Murillo (24 January 1611 – 13 February 1675) was a Roman Catholic prelate who served as Bishop of Santiago de Guatemala (1668–1675) and Bishop of Santiago de Cuba (1661–1668). He was also selected and confirmed as Bishop of Tlaxcala in 1675 after his death.

Biography
Juan de Sancto Mathía Sáenz de Mañozca y Murillo was born in México on 24 January 1611.
On 5 September 1661, he was appointed during the papacy of Pope Alexander VII as Bishop of Santiago de Cuba. On 24 August 1662, he was consecrated bishop by Diego Osorio de Escobar y Llamas, Bishop of Tlaxcala. On 27 February 1668, he was appointed during the papacy of Pope Clement IX as Bishop of Santiago de Guatemala and installed on 13 June 1668. He served as Bishop of Santiago de Guatemala until his death on 13 February 1675. As notification of his death had not yet reached Rome and Spain, on 14 April 1675, he was selected by the King of Spain as Bishop of Tlaxcala and on 17 June 1675, he was confirmed by Pope Clement X.

While bishop, he was the principal consecrator of Alfonso Bravo de Laguna, Bishop of Nicaragua (1671).

References

External links and additional sources
 (for Chronology of Bishops)  
 (for Chronology of Bishops) 
 (for Chronology of Bishops) 
 (for Chronology of Bishops) 
 (for Chronology of Bishops) 
 (for Chronology of Bishops) 

17th-century Roman Catholic bishops in Cuba
Bishops appointed by Pope Alexander VII
Bishops appointed by Pope Clement IX
Bishops appointed by Pope Clement X
1611 births
1675 deaths
17th-century Roman Catholic bishops in Guatemala
Roman Catholic bishops of Guatemala (pre-1743)
Roman Catholic bishops of Santiago de Cuba